Karleen Pendleton Jiménez is an American-Canadian writer and academic. She is best known for her 2000 book Are You a Boy or a Girl?, a 2001 Lambda Literary Award finalist which was adapted into the 2008 film Tomboy, and her 2011 memoir How to Get a Girl Pregnant, a 2012 Lambda Literary Award finalist.

Originally from Los Angeles, California, she is currently a full professor in the School of Education at Trent University in Peterborough, Ontario. In addition to her literary work, she also co-edited, with Isabel Killoran, the academic anthology Unleashing the Unpopular: Talking About Sexual Orientation and Gender Diversity in Education.

Works
Are You a Boy or a Girl? (2000)
Unleashing the Unpopular (2009)
How to Get a Girl Pregnant (2011)
Tomboys and Other Gender Heroes: Confessions from the Classroom (2016)
The Street Belongs to Us (2021)

References

External links

1971 births
American children's writers
American memoirists
American expatriate writers in Canada
Canadian children's writers
Canadian memoirists
Canadian lesbian writers
LGBT Hispanic and Latino American people
Lesbian memoirists
Academic staff of Trent University
Living people
20th-century American essayists
21st-century American essayists
20th-century Canadian non-fiction writers
21st-century Canadian non-fiction writers
20th-century Canadian women writers
21st-century Canadian women writers
American women memoirists
American women children's writers
Canadian women memoirists
20th-century American women writers
American women academics
21st-century American women writers
American lesbian writers
21st-century Canadian LGBT people
20th-century Canadian LGBT people